Dejan Šulkić is a Serbian politician. He was the mayor of Velika Plana from 2004 to 2015 and is currently serving his second term as a member of the National Assembly of Serbia. Šulkić is a member of the New Democratic Party of Serbia (Nova demokratska stranka Srbije, NDSS), which was known until May 2022 as the Democratic Party of Serbia (Demokratska stranka Srbije, DSS).

Early life and career
Šulkić was born in Velika Plana, in what was then the Socialist Republic of Serbia in the Socialist Federal Republic of Yugoslavia. He is a graduate of the University of Kragujevac Faculty of Law, and he was the director of the JP "Plana" in Velika Plana in the early 2000s.

Politician

Local politics
Serbia briefly introduced the direct election of mayors in the 2004 local elections. Šulkić ran as the DSS's candidate for mayor of Velika Plana and was elected in the second round of voting. The direct election of mayors was later replaced by indirect election from the elected members of municipal assemblies; Šulkić led the DSS to victories in Velika Plana in the 2008 and 2012 local elections and was in each case confirmed for a new term as mayor afterward. His tenure as mayor ended in August 2015, when the local Democratic Party (Demokratska stranka, DS) board ended its alliance with the DSS and formed a new local coalition government with the Serbian Progressive Party (Srpska napredna stranka, SNS). In leaving office, Šulkić pointed to a track record of sound management over the previous eleven years. (The local DS board's decision to align with the SNS met with disapproval from that party's leadership, which dissolved the board shortly thereafter.)

The DSS contested the 2016 local elections in Velika Plana in an alliance with the Strength of Serbia Movement (Pokret Snaga Srbije, PSS) and the Serbian Renewal Movement (Srpski pokret obnove, SPO). Šulkić led the alliance's electoral list and was re-elected to the local assembly when the list won seven mandates.

The DSS subsequently formed an electoral alliance called METLA 2020. Although the alliance was identified on the ballot as "METLA 2020 - Dejan B. Šulkić" for the 2020 local elections in Velika Plana, Šulkić only appeared in the twelfth position (out of fourteen) on its list and was not re-elected when the list won three mandates.

Politics at the Republic Level
Šulkić received the 219th position (out of 250) on the DSS's electoral list in the 2003 Serbian parliamentary election. The list won fifty-three mandates, and he was not afterward included in the party's assembly delegation. (From 2000 to 2011, Serbian parliamentary mandates were awarded to sponsoring parties or coalitions rather than individual candidates, and it was common practice for the mandates to be assigned out of numerical order. Šulkić could have been selected for a mandate despite his low position on the list, although in the event he was not.)

Serbia's electoral system was reformed in 2011, such that parliamentary mandates were awarded in numerical order to candidates on successful lists. Šulkić received the fifty-second position on the DSS's list for the 2012 parliamentary election and was not elected when the list won twenty-two mandates. He was chosen as president of the DSS's executive board in June 2015.

Parliamentarian (2016–20, 2022–)
The DSS contested the 2016 Serbian parliamentary election in an alliance with Dveri. Šulkić received the sixth position on their combined list and was this time elected to the national assembly when the list won thirteen mandates. The election was won by the Progressive Party and its allies, and the DSS served in opposition. 

The DSS experienced a serious split in late 2016, following which Šulkić, Gorica Gajić, and Milan Lapčević were the only assembly members to remain with the party; as five members are needed to form a parliamentary group, all sat as independents. Lapčević subsequently left the DSS as well. In May 2017, Šulkić was chosen as one of the DSS's three vice-presidents. During the 2016–20 parliament, he was a member of the committee on constitutional and legislative issues and the committee on the diaspora and Serbs in the region; a deputy member of the committee on labour, social issues, social inclusion, and poverty reduction; and a member of the parliamentary friendship groups with Montenegro, North Macedonia, and Slovenia.

The DSS contested the 2020 Serbian parliamentary election as part of the METLA 2020 alliance, and Šulkić appeared in the fourth position on its list. The list did not cross the electoral threshold to win representation in the assembly.

In 2021, the DSS co-founded the National Democratic Alternative (Nacionalno demokratska alternativa, NADA), a political alliance of national conservative parties in Serbia. Šulkić appeared in the sixth position on NADA's electoral list in the 2022 Serbian parliamentary election and was elected to a second term in the assembly when the list won fifteen mandates. The Progressives and their allies once again won the election, and the DSS (now renamed as the NDSS) remains in opposition.

Šulkić is now a member of the committee on the judiciary, public administration, and local self-government, and a deputy member of the committee on constitutional and legislative issues and the security services control committee. He was also appointed as a deputy member of Serbia's delegation to the Parliamentary Assembly of the Council of Europe (PACE), where he is an alternate on the committee on migration, refugees, and displaced persons. He continues to serve as one of the NDSS's vice-presidents.

Electoral record

Local (Velika Plana)

References

1972 births
Living people
People from Velika Plana
Mayors of places in Serbia
Members of the National Assembly (Serbia)
Substitute Members of the Parliamentary Assembly of the Council of Europe
Democratic Party of Serbia politicians
New Democratic Party of Serbia politicians